The .440 Cor-Bon is a large-caliber handgun cartridge, first produced by Cor-Bon in 1998. 
Although it looks similar to a .357 SIG, this cartridge was designed after being necked down from an existing cartridge, the .50 AE to accept a .44-caliber (.429 in) (10.89 mm) bullet. This is fairly typical in the wildcat cartridge industry.

History
The .50 AE was introduced in the Desert Eagle from Magnum Research in 1991, and shortly thereafter shooters began requesting an alternative to the relatively small selection of factory ammunition, and, for sensitive shooters, the recoil of the .50 round, but still with substantially more stopping power than the .44 Magnum.

In designing the .440, Cor-Bon created a lighter recoiling round than the .50 AE with greater penetrating power than the .50 AE and .44 Magnum. The round has a flatter trajectory, and leaves the barrel considerably faster than either the .50 AE or the .44 Mag. However, the cartridge has never been popular, and has remained fairly expensive. Consequentially, Magnum Research no longer produces a Desert Eagle in .440 Cor-Bon, but has introduced a similar cartridge, the .429 DE.  The .440 Cor-Bon cartridge will not chamber in a 429 DE barrel, but a 429 DE will chamber in a .440 Cor-Bon barrel.

Uses
The round is generally considered to be a hunting round rather than a defense round for a number of reasons. Its excessive penetration and recoil make it unsuitable for self-defense.  Also, as it is physically a very large cartridge, commonly chambered in a very large pistol such as the Desert Eagle, it is not particularly practical to carry it concealed.

It is effective at disabling and killing large animals, able to penetrate large bones, such as the shoulder, in deer. Some gunsmiths are chambering lever-action rifles to take full advantage of this cartridge on large game.
Tromix also produced AR-15 rifles and uppers chambered in .440 Cor-Bon from 1999 — 2004.  Only about 20 were manufactured before being discontinued.

See also
 List of handgun cartridges
 10 mm caliber Other similar size cartridges
 .429 DE Similar but incompatible cartridge

References

Pistol and rifle cartridges
Magnum pistol cartridges
Cor-Bon cartridges